The Calgary Awards is an award given out annually by the Canadian city of Calgary. It is managed by the official citizen recognition program of Calgary and was established in 1994. It is meant to celebrate contributions done to the community by Calgarians. There are several categories, ranging from "Citizen of the Year", "The Award for Accessibility", "The Community Achievement Awards", "The Environmental Achievement Award", "The Signature Award" and the "W.O. Mitchell Book Prize". Recipients are honored at a ceremony attended by the Mayor of Calgary and members of the City Council which is televised Telus.

References

External links
Calgary Awards at Calgary.ca

Alberta awards
1994 establishments in Alberta
Awards established in 1994
Culture of Calgary